Temotu (or Te Motu, literally "the island" in Polynesian) is the easternmost province of Solomon Islands. The province was formerly known as Santa Cruz Islands Province. It consists, essentially, of two chains of islands which run parallel to each other from the northwest to the southeast.

Administrative divisions
Temotu Province is sub-divided into the following wards:

Temotu Province (pop 21,362)

 Reef Islands
 Polynesian Outer Islands (353) 
 Fenualoa (1,305) 
 Nipua/Nopoli (880)
 Lipe/Temua (796)
 Manuopo (1,030)
 Nenumpo (1,163)
 Santa Cruz Islands
 Graciosa Bay (1,264) 
 North East Santa Cruz (1,843)
 Nanggu/Lord Howe (1,863) 
 Nea/Noole (1,770) 
 Nevenema (947) 
 Luva Station (2,335)
 Neo (1,558) 
 isolated islands and groups
 Duff Islands (509)
 Utupua (1,168)
 Vanikoro (1,293)
 Tikopia (1,285)

Islands
The islands or island groups which make up the province are:

 Anuta
 Duff Islands (including Taumako)
 Fatutaka
 Malo
 Reef Islands (including Fenualoa, Lomlom, Makalom, Matema, Nalongo and Nupani, Nifiloli, Nukapu, Patteson Shoal, Pigeon Island and Pileni)
 Santa Cruz Islands (including the large island Nendö)
 Tikopia
 Tinakula
 Utupua
 Vanikoro (including Banie and Teanu)

The provincial capital is Lata, located on Nendö, the largest and most important of the Santa Cruz islands.

Population

The population of 21,362 (2009) is quite diverse for the small land area encompassed.  The Santa Cruz Islanders are predominantly Melanesian, although the inhabitants of Tikopia, Anuta, the Duff Islands and some of the Reef Islands are Polynesians.

Languages
The province has given its name to the Temotu languages, a putative linguistic subgroup within the broader Oceanic family of languages.

The languages spoken in the province include all nine Temotu languages proper, plus two Polynesian outlier languages: Vaeakau-Taumako and Tikopia.

See also
Remote Oceania

References

External links
Solomon Islands Photogallery of Temotu Province.  Includes a map.

Provinces of the Solomon Islands
States and territories established in 1981